Auratonota meion is a species of moth of the family Tortricidae. It is found in the Western Cordillera in Colombia.

The wingspan is about 12.5 mm. The ground colour of the forewings is whitish suffused with cream and yellow. The markings are yellower and darker than the ground colour. The hindwings are white cream, tinged with brownish at the apex and on the veins.

Etymology
The species name refers to the size of the moth and is derived from Greek meion (meaning smaller).

References

Moths described in 2011
Auratonota
Moths of South America